Chapman is a suburb of Canberra, Australian Capital Territory, Australia, where many diplomats and some of the wealthier citizens of Canberra chose to take their residency. It is located in the Weston Creek area. 

The suburb is named after Sir Austin Chapman (1864–1926), the member for Eden-Monaro from 1901 to 1926 who held portfolios in the Deakin and Bruce governments.

The theme for the street names in Chapman is the Australian film industry.

The local primary school in Chapman is the government run Chapman Primary School on Perry Drive. The school caters for students from Preschool to Year 6 and runs a before and afterschool care program.

Geology
Laidlaw Volcanics pale to dark grey dacitic tuff covers most of Chapman. Shale, sandstone, ashstone and tuff is found near the west end of Rafferty Street. Quaternary alluvium covers up the eastern valley.

References

Suburbs of Canberra